John Brown House, also known as the Ritner Boarding House, is a historic home located in Chambersburg in Franklin County, Pennsylvania. It is a two-story, three-bay wide, hewn-log building covered in clapboard. Abolitionist John Brown (1800–1859) stayed here from June until mid-October 1859, while receiving supplies and recruits for his raid on Harpers Ferry.  Following the raid, four of Brown's followers returned to the house to be concealed.  It is operated by the Franklin County Historical Society - Kittochtinny, as a historic house museum.

It was listed on the National Register of Historic Places in 1970.  It is included in the Chambersburg Historic District. It has been designated as an authentic site in the National Underground Railroad Network to Freedom.

References

External links
The John Brown House website

John Brown sites
Historic house museums in Pennsylvania
Houses on the National Register of Historic Places in Pennsylvania
Houses in Franklin County, Pennsylvania
Museums in Franklin County, Pennsylvania
National Register of Historic Places in Franklin County, Pennsylvania
Individually listed contributing properties to historic districts on the National Register in Pennsylvania
Monuments and memorials to John Brown (abolitionist)